The Hours is a 2002 American psychological drama film directed by Stephen Daldry and starring Meryl Streep, Julianne Moore, and Nicole Kidman. Supporting roles are played by Ed Harris, John C. Reilly, Stephen Dillane, Jeff Daniels, Miranda Richardson, Allison Janney, Toni Collette, Claire Danes, and Eileen Atkins. The screenplay by David Hare is based on Michael Cunningham's 1999 Pulitzer Prize-winning novel of the same name.

The plot focuses on three women of different generations whose lives are interconnected by the 1925 novel Mrs Dalloway by Virginia Woolf. The women are Clarissa Vaughan (Streep), a New Yorker preparing an award party for her AIDS-stricken long-time friend and poet, Richard (Harris) in 2001; Laura Brown (Moore), a pregnant 1950s California housewife in an unhappy marriage, with a young son; and Virginia Woolf (Kidman) herself in 1920s England, who is struggling with depression and mental illness while trying to write her novel.

The film was theatrically released in Los Angeles and New York City on Christmas Day 2002, and was given a limited release in the United States two days later on December 27 before expanding in January 2003. Critical reaction to the film was positive, with nine Academy Award nominations for The Hours including Best Picture, and a win for Nicole Kidman for Best Actress. The film and novel were adapted into an opera with the same name in 2022.

Plot

With the exception of the opening and final scenes, which depict the 1941 suicide by drowning of Virginia Woolf in the River Ouse, the film takes place within the span of a single day in three different decades, alternating between them to follow three women: Virginia Woolf in 1923, Laura Brown in 1951, and Clarissa Vaughan in 2001. The following plot summary has been simplified and is in chronological order, not the order as presented in the film.

1923 
Virginia Woolf has begun writing the book Mrs Dalloway in her home in the town of Richmond outside London. Virginia has experienced several nervous breakdowns and suffers from depression. She is constantly under the eye of her servants and her husband, Leonard, who has begun a publishing business at home, Hogarth Press, to stay close to her. Virginia's sister, Vanessa, and her children, Julian, Quentin, and Angelica, come over for an afternoon visit. She and Vanessa talk about Vanessa's life in London and Virginia's mental condition. She longs for a life similar to Vanessa’s, living in London. Vanessa's children find a dead bird. Virginia and Angelica make a funeral for the bird. Virginia lies down beside the bird and looks into its eyes. She sees herself in the dead bird, suffering and dying in her circumstances. Everyone goes back inside and Virginia continues writing her book. She says that she was going to kill her heroine but instead chooses to kill another character in the book. Before Vanessa leaves, Virginia passionately kisses her sister. It is clear Virginia wants them to stay and wants her sister's life. After their departure, Virginia flees to the train station, where she is awaiting a train to London. Leonard arrives to stop her, and they argue. He tells her that Richmond was intended to soothe her mental illness and that he lives in constant fear that she will take her own life. She replies that she also lives with that fear but argues that she has the right to choose her own destiny and that she would prefer London, even if it means her death, to remaining stifled in Richmond. Leonard mournfully concedes, and they return home, where Virginia begins writing again. Leonard questions her as to why someone has to die. Virginia says “In order that the rest of us should value life more.” Leonard asks who will die and Virginia says "The poet will die, the visionary.”

1951 
Pregnant with her second child, Laura Brown spends her days in her tract home in Los Angeles with her young son, Richie, and escapes from her conventional life by reading Mrs Dalloway. She married her husband, Dan, soon after World War II. On the surface they are living the American Dream, but she is nonetheless deeply unhappy. She and Richie make a cake for Dan's birthday, but it is a disaster. Her neighbor Kitty drops in to ask Laura to feed her dog while she's in the hospital for a procedure. Kitty reveals that the procedure is related to the fact that she has been unable to conceive, that it may portend permanent infertility, and that she really feels that a woman is not complete until she is a mother. Kitty tries to stay upbeat, but Laura senses her sadness and fear and embraces her. Laura escalates this comforting gesture into a passionate kiss; Kitty then leaves, politely refusing to acknowledge the kiss. Laura and Richie successfully make another cake and clean up, and then she takes Richie to stay with a babysitter, Mrs. Latch. Richie runs after his mother in anguish as she drives away, fearing that she will never come back. Laura checks in to a hotel, where she intends to commit suicide. Laura removes several bottles of pills and Mrs Dalloway from her purse and begins to read it. She drifts off to sleep and dreams that the hotel room is flooded and she almost drowns. She awakens with a change of heart and caresses her belly button and cries. She picks up Richie and kisses him, and they return home to celebrate Dan's birthday. Dan gratefully says the dream of this domestic happiness is what kept him going during the war, seemingly oblivious to Laura's dissatisfaction.

2001 
Clarissa Vaughan, a literary editor in New York City, shares a first name with the novel's title character. She spends the day preparing to host a party in honor of her friend and ex-lover Richard, a moody poet and author living with AIDS who is to receive a major literary award. Clarissa was in a relationship with Richard during their college years, but has spent the past 10 years living with a female partner, Sally Lester, while also caring for Richard during his illness. Richard tells Clarissa that he has only stayed alive for her sake and that the award is meaningless, given more to acknowledge his illness than for the work itself. She tries reassuring him. Richard often refers to Clarissa as "Mrs. Dalloway" – her namesake – because she distracts herself from her own life the way that the Woolf character does. Clarissa returns home, surprised to meet Richard's ex-lover Louis Waters, who has returned for the festivities. Louis and Clarissa discuss Richard's use of their real lives in his novel and Clarissa's feelings of "unraveling". Clarissa's daughter, Julia, comes home to help her prepare, and listens while Clarissa admits that her life feels trivial and false in comparison to her youthful happiness. When Clarissa goes to bring Richard to his party, editing reveals that Richard is the young boy from 1951. Deeply distraught, he tells Clarissa that he cannot bear to face "the hours" that will make up the rest of his life, then commits suicide in front of her by falling from a window. Later that night, Richard's mother, Laura Brown, arrives at Clarissa's apartment. Laura is aware that her abandonment of her family was deeply traumatic for Richard, but Laura reveals that it was a better decision for her to leave the family after the birth of her daughter than to commit suicide. She does not apologize for the hurt that she caused to her family and suggests that it's not possible to feel regret for something over which she had no choice. She acknowledges that no one will forgive her, but she offers an explanation: "It was death. I chose life."

The film ends with Virginia's suicide by drowning with a voice-over in which Virginia thanks Leonard for loving her: "Always the years between us. Always the years. Always the love. Always the hours."

Cast

1923
 Nicole Kidman as Virginia Woolf
 Stephen Dillane as Leonard Woolf
 Miranda Richardson as Vanessa Bell
 George Loftus as Quentin Bell
 Charley Ramm as Julian Bell
 Sophie Wyburd as Angelica Bell
 Lyndsey Marshal as Lottie Hope
 Linda Bassett as Nelly Boxall

1951
 Julianne Moore as Laura Brown
 John C. Reilly as Dan Brown
 Jack Rovello as Richard "Richie" Brown
 Toni Collette as Kitty
 Margo Martindale as Mrs. Latch

2001
 Meryl Streep as Clarissa Vaughan
 Ed Harris as Richard "Richie" Brown
 Allison Janney as Sally Lester
 Claire Danes as Julia Vaughan
 Jeff Daniels as Louis Waters
 Eileen Atkins as Barbara
 Julianne Moore as Older Laura Brown

Reception

Box office
The Hours opened in New York City and Los Angeles on Christmas Day 2002 and went into limited release in the United States and Canada two days later. It grossed $1,070,856 on eleven screens in its first two weeks of release. On January 10, 2003, it expanded to 45 screens, and the following week it expanded to 402. On February 14 it went into wide release, playing in 1,003 theaters in the US and Canada. With an estimated budget of $25 million, the film eventually earned $41,675,994 in the US and Canada and $67,170,078 in foreign markets for a total worldwide box office of $108,846,072. It was the 47th highest-grossing film of 2002.

Critical response

On the review aggregation website Rotten Tomatoes the film holds an approval of 79% based on 195 reviews, and an average rating of 7.50/10. The site's critics consensus reads, "The movie may be a downer, but it packs an emotional wallop. Some fine acting on display here." On Metacritic, the film has a weighted average score of 80 out of 100, based on 40 critics, indicating "generally favorable reviews". Audiences surveyed by CinemaScore gave the film an average grade of "B−" on an A+ to F scale.

Richard Schickel of Time criticized the film's simplistic characterization, saying, "Watching The Hours, one finds oneself focusing excessively on the unfortunate prosthetic nose Kidman affects in order to look more like the novelist. And wondering why the screenwriter, David Hare, and the director, Stephen Daldry, turn Woolf, a woman of incisive mind, into a hapless ditherer." He also criticized its overt politicization: "But this movie is in love with female victimization. Moore's Laura is trapped in the suburban flatlands of the '50s, while Streep's Clarissa is moored in a hopeless love for Laura's homosexual son (Ed Harris, in a truly ugly performance), an AIDS sufferer whose relentless anger is directly traceable to Mom's long-ago desertion of him. Somehow, despite the complexity of the film's structure, this all seems too simple-minded. Or should we perhaps say agenda driven? This ultimately proves insufficient to lend meaning to their lives or profundity to a grim and uninvolving film, for which Philip Glass unwittingly provides the perfect score—tuneless, oppressive, droning, painfully self-important."

Stephen Holden of The New York Times called the film "deeply moving" and "an amazingly faithful screen adaptation" and added, "Although suicide eventually tempts three of the film's characters, The Hours is not an unduly morbid film. Clear eyed and austerely balanced would be a more accurate description, along with magnificently written and acted. Mr. Glass's surging minimalist score, with its air of cosmic abstraction, serves as ideal connective tissue for a film that breaks down temporal barriers." Mick LaSalle of the San Francisco Chronicle observed, "Director Stephen Daldry employs the wonderful things cinema can do in order to realize aspects of The Hours that Cunningham could only hint at or approximate on the page. The result is something rare, especially considering how fine the novel is, a film that's fuller and deeper than the book ... It's marvelous to watch the ways in which [David Hare] consistently dramatizes the original material without compromising its integrity or distorting its intent ... Cunningham's [novel] touched on notes of longing, middle-aged angst and the sense of being a small consciousness in the midst of a grand mystery. But Daldry and Hare's [film] sounds those notes and sends audiences out reverberating with them, exalted."

Peter Travers of Rolling Stone awarded the film, which he thought "sometimes stumbles on literary pretensions," three out of four stars. He praised the performances, commenting, "Kidman's acting is superlative, full of passion and feeling ... Moore is wrenching in her scenes with Laura's son (Jack Rovello, an exceptional child actor). And Streep is a miracle worker, building a character in the space between words and worlds. These three unimprovable actresses make The Hours a thing of beauty."

Philip French of The Observer called it "a moving, somewhat depressing film that demands and rewards attention." He thought "the performances are remarkable" but found the Philip Glass score to be "relentless" and "over-amplified." Steve Persall of the St. Petersburg Times said it "is the most finely crafted film of the past year that I never want to sit through again. The performances are flawless, the screenplay is intelligently crafted, and the overall mood is relentlessly bleak. It is a film to be admired, not embraced, and certainly not to be enjoyed for any reason other than its expertise." Peter Bradshaw of The Guardian rated the film three out of five stars and commented, "It is a daring act of extrapolation, and a real departure from most movie-making, which can handle only one universe at a time ... The performances that Daldry elicits ... are all strong: tightly managed, smoothly and dashingly juxtaposed under a plangent score ... Part of the bracing experimental impact of the film was the absence of narrative connection between the three women. Supplying one in the final reel undermines its formal daring, but certainly packs an emotional punch. It makes for an elegant and poignant chamber music of the soul."

Accolades

Soundtrack

The film's score by Philip Glass won the BAFTA Award for Best Film Music and was nominated for the Academy Award for Best Original Score and the Golden Globe Award for Best Original Score. The soundtrack album was nominated for the Grammy Award for Best Score Soundtrack Album for a Motion Picture, Television or Other Visual Media.

Further reading 
 Taylor, C. J. (2015). The Hours - A film to enhance teaching psychology. Academic Exchange Quarterly, 19(2), 17–22.

Notes

References

External links

 
 
 
 
 
 The Hours - filming the railway sequences

2002 films
2000s feminist films
2002 LGBT-related films
2000s psychological drama films
American feminist films
American LGBT-related films
American nonlinear narrative films
American psychological drama films
BAFTA winners (films)
Best Drama Picture Golden Globe winners
Best Foreign Film Guldbagge Award winners
Biographical films about writers
Cultural depictions of Virginia Woolf
2000s English-language films
Films about bipolar disorder
Films about depression
Films about dysfunctional families
Films about gender
Films about suicide
Films about mother–son relationships
Films about writers
Films based on American novels
Films directed by Stephen Daldry
Films featuring a Best Actress Academy Award-winning performance
Films featuring a Best Drama Actress Golden Globe-winning performance
Films produced by Scott Rudin
Films scored by Philip Glass
Films set in 1923
Films set in 1941
Films set in 1951
Films set in 2001
Films set in California
Films set in Coral Gables, Florida
Films set in London
Films set in Manhattan
Films shot at Pinewood Studios
LGBT-related drama films
LGBT-related films based on actual events
Miramax films
Paramount Pictures films
Films distributed by Disney
Incest in film
HIV/AIDS in American films
Virginia Woolf in performing arts
2002 drama films
2000s American films